The following is a list of episodes for the Fox and Sci Fi Channel original series Sliders. The series aired on Fox from March 1995 to May 1997 and on the Sci Fi Channel from June 1998 to February 2000. A total of 88 episodes were produced.

Series overview

Episodes

Season 1 (1995)

Fox changed the intended order of the episodes, beginning with episodes they thought would draw in audiences. This often causes confusion and sometimes chronological errors in continuity with respect to the story arc (for example, episode 5 "Prince of Wails" opens with the resolution to the cliffhanger brought about in episode 6 "Summer of Love"). The intended and filmed order of the episodes is shown by the production code order of the episodes, with the pilot being first.

Season 2 (1996)
As in Season 1, Fox again broadcast the episodes out of their intended order, this time even changing the finale. The intended order of the episodes is shown by the production codes.

Season 3 (1996–1997)
Again, Fox aired this season's episodes out of order. For instance, "Double Cross" was filmed as the premiere for Season Three. In this episode, the audience learns why the Sliders will now be able to slide anywhere between San Francisco and L.A. However, Fox opted to air "Rules of the Game" first, since it was a more action-oriented episode. The intended order of the episodes is shown by the production codes. The proper viewing order is as follows:

Season 4 (1998–1999)

Season 5 (1999–2000)

Notes
 Episode titles for season one were not shown on screen; they come from production scripts, and DVD descriptions.

References

External links

 List of Sliders episodes at the Internet Movie Database
 Earth Prime, a detailed episode guide, including speculation about the derivations of the various alternate dimensions
 Sliders (a Titles and Air Dates Guide) at the Epguides.com
 Guide in German with international episode titles

Sliders
Episodes